Thiruvananthapuram Central, formerly Trivandrum Central (also known as Thampanoor railway station) (station code: TVC), is a major railway station which serves the city of Thiruvananthapuram (formerly Trivandrum), capital of Kerala state, India. It is the busiest railway station in Kerala and an important rail hub in Southern Railway. The building of the railway station is one of the iconic landmarks of Thiruvananthapuram. The station is located at the heart of the city opposite to Central bus station Thiruvananthapuram at Thampanoor. Thiruvananthapuram Pettah and Nemom are the adjacent railway stations towards north and south respectively. Trains from here connect the city and the state to almost all the major cities in India. This station is also noted for a whole range of amenities available within the premises. The station has book-shops, restaurants, accommodation and Internet browsing centers. A satellite station was opened in 2005 at Kochuveli which is at 8 km towards northwest known as  railway station, near the Thiruvananthapuram International Airport. Most of the long distance trains departs from here. Thiruvananthapuram is the first tier 2 city from south along the longest train routes in India, the Kanyakumari–Thiruvananthapuram–Dibrugarh Vivek Express route and the Kanyakumari–Thiruvananthapuram–Jammu Tawi–Shri Mata Vaishno Devi Katra Himsagar Express route. A second terminal (South Terminal) was opened in 2004 to handle passenger traffic and later a West Terminal in 2007. To reduce traffic, the Thiruvananthapuram Central railway station has 16 railway tracks

History 
The Madras–Quilon line was extended to the capital of the Princely State of Travancore, Thiruvananthapuram and was opened on 4 January 1918. The line then terminated at Chackai, which was the trading centre of Thiruvananthapuram then. M. E. Watts, Dewan of the erstwhile Travancore, took the initiative to extend the railway line to the heart of the city. The terminus was shifted to current location Thiruvananthapuram Central Thampanoor in 1931. The Thiruvananthapuram Central station building was built during the reign of Sethu Lakshmi Bayi, the Maharani of Travancore, and inaugurated on 4 November 1931. No bricks were used for the construction of this station building; it was built completely with rock masonry. Thiruvananthapuram was a branch line station but the Maharani built it at par with the counterparts in the major cities of India. The station was built to handle two departures per day in 1931 and had only one platform in the beginning. The platform with a single line continued till the 70s. The extended platform continued to receive and send trains as a metre-gauge line until gauge conversion. The platform could accommodate two trains at a time in that single line platform.

Layout
This station has 5 platforms to handle long and short-distance trains. The Thiruvananthapuram railway station has two entrances. The main entrance is opposite to Central bus station Thiruvananthapuram and western entrance is on Power House road. The train care centre functions adjacent to western side entrance. Nemom and  railway stations are announced in railway budget as satellite terminals to Thiruvananthapuram Central. Kochuveli satellite terminal has started functioning with trains originating from here. There is a proposal to add two more platforms once Nemom and Kochuveli stations are operational with terminal facilities.

Amenities
Thiruvananthapuram Central is well equipped with modern security gadgets, and is the first station in the state to install video surveillance. The Networked electronic surveillance system is installed in this Central Station by Railway Protection Force (RPF) for improving the security and for monitoring the movement of passengers arriving at the station.

Future 
It was announced in railway budget to convert Thiruvananthapuram Central railway station into world-class standards. The foundation stone for expansion and modernization of station was laid by former Union Minister for Railways, Lalu Prasad in December 2006. Tenders have been invited for carrying out feasibility studies for this proposed project. All modern facilities including an office and commercial complex is planned here. The proposal to set up a passenger terminal at Nemom is announced in rail budget and yet to begin work. It is estimated that only a consortium would be able to take up expansion project of Thiruvananthapuram Central, since the project is a massive one. Feasibility study for Chennai–Bangalore–Thiruvananthapuram high-speed rail corridor ongoing and is being planned along with other few corridors in country.

Landmark train services 

Incidents
 A shunting engine trailed through at point number 57A near Route Relay Interlocking cabin and damaged the point and signal gears in Thiruvananthapuram Central yard. No casualties.

See also

 
 
 
 
 Southern Railway zone

References

External links
 Indian Railways

Railway stations in Thiruvananthapuram
Railway centrals in India
Thiruvananthapuram railway division
Railway stations opened in 1931